Ferryden Park Primary School was a primary school in the Adelaide inner north west suburb of Ferryden Park.

In 1959 the student enrolment at the school peaked at 639 students, due in part to the post-war boom of the 1950s.

Ferryden Park Primary School closed at the end of 2010. It merged with four similar schools of the area to form the new Woodville Gardens School and based at site of the old Ridley Grove Primary School. The merger occurred as part of the Education Works New Schools Project of the Department of Education and Children's Services. The school's lands were earmarked for a new housing development.

References

External links
 Official site

Primary schools in South Australia